The 1970 National Challenge Cup was the 57th awarding of the United States Soccer Football Association's annual open soccer championship prize. Teams from the North American Soccer League declined to participate.  The Elizabeth S.C. defeated the Los Angeles Croatia in the final game.

Bracket

External links
 1970 U.S. Open Cup – TheCup.us

Lamar Hunt U.S. Open Cup
U.S. Open Cup